Mark "Spike" Stent (born 3 August 1965) is an English record producer and mixing engineer who has worked with many international artists including Madonna, Marshmello, U2, Beyoncé, Björk, Depeche Mode, Echo & the Bunnymen, Grimes, Ed Sheeran, Beth Orton, Harry Styles, Frank Ocean, Selena Gomez, All Saints, Spice Girls, Lady Gaga, Coldplay, Mansun, Maroon 5, Muse, Lily Allen, Gwen Stefani, Moby, No Doubt, Lenka, Usher, Kaiser Chiefs, Linkin Park, the Yeah Yeah Yeahs, Oasis, Keane, Massive Attack, Bastille, Diana Vickers and Take That.

Career
Stent grew up in Hampshire, England and first gained experience as an engineer at Jacob Studios as a teenager before a two-year stint at Trident Studios.  After Trident, Stent worked at Olympic Studios in Barnes, South London. While at Olympic, Stent worked with artists such as Massive Attack, Bjork, Madonna, U2, Keane, and Oasis. Radiohead enlisted him to produce their 2007 album In Rainbows, but the collaboration was unsuccessful.<ref name=":5">{{Cite magazine |last=Vozick-Levinson |first=Simon |date=27 April 2012 |title=The making of Radiohead's In Rainbows''' |url=https://www.rollingstone.com/music/music-news/the-making-of-radioheads-in-rainbows-187534/ |url-status=live |magazine=Rolling Stone |archive-url=https://web.archive.org/web/20190730031338/https://www.rollingstone.com/music/music-news/the-making-of-radioheads-in-rainbows-187534/ |archive-date=30 July 2019 |access-date=30 July 2019}}</ref>

Stent works at two studios: Mix Suite LA in EastWest Studios and Mix Suite UK.

Awards and nominations
Grammy Awards

Billboard Music Awards

Music Producers Guild (MPG) Awards

Selected film credits

Selected discography
 2020s 

 2020: Marilyn Manson – We Are Chaos 2020: 5 Seconds of Summer –  Calm
 2020: Niall Horan – Heartbreak Weather 2020: Ted When – Edge Off 2020: Miley Cyrus – Plastic Hearts 2021: John Mayer – Sob Rock 2022: Liam Gallagher – C'mon You Know 2022: Peter Gabriel – i/o 2023: Gorillaz – Cracker Island 

 2010s 

 2019: Charli XCX featuring Lizzo - "Blame It on Your Love"
 2018: Post Malone – "Stay"
 2018: Cardi B – "Thru Your Phone"
 2018: Elton John – "REVAMP" tracks "Your Song" Featuring Lady Gaga & Bennie & The Jets featuring Pink & Logic
 2018: Pale Waves – "Heavenly"
 2018: Jade Bird – "Lottery"
 2018: Chvrches – "Love is Dead"
 2018: Years & Years – "Sanctify"
 2018: Rudimental – "These Days Featuring Jess Glynne, Macklemore & Dan Caplen"
 2018: Marshmello Featuring Anne Marie – "Friends"
 2017: Kesha – "This is Me from The Greatest Showman"
 2017: Miguel – "War & Leisure"
 2017: Bishop Briggs – "Dream"
 2017: Jessie Ware – Glasshouse 2017: PVRIS – "All We Know of Heaven, All We Need of Hell"
 2017: Justin Bieber  and BloodPop– "Friends"
 2017: Muse – "Dig Down"
 2017: Mondo Cozmo – "Plastic Soul"
 2017: Niall Horan – "Slow Hands"
 2017: Vince Staples – Big Fish Theory 2017: Harry Styles – Harry Styles 2017: Ed Sheeran – ÷ 2017: Julia Michaels – "Issues"
 2017: Julia Michaels – "Uh Huh"
 2017: Julia Michaels – "Nervous Systems"
 2017: Rita Ora – "Your Song"
 2017: Liam Gallagher – "As You Were"
 2017: DreamCar – "Dreamcar"
 2017: Take That - “Giants”
 2016: Gwen Stefani – This Is What the Truth Feels Like 2015: Selena Gomez – Revival 2015: Florence + the Machine – How Big, How Blue, How Beautiful 2015: Chvrches – Every Open Eye 2015: Grimes – Art Angels 2015: Duran Duran – Paper Gods 2014: Coldplay – Ghost Stories 2014: Ed Sheeran – x 2014: The Script – No Sound Without Silence 2014: Kasabian – 48:13 2013: Biffy Clyro – Opposites 2013: Bastille – Bad Blood 2013: Rudimental – Home 2013: White Lies – Big TV 2013: Haim – Days Are Gone 2013: Moby – Innocents 2013: John Newman – Tribute 2013: One Direction – Midnight Memories 2012: Frank Ocean – Channel Orange 2012: No Doubt – Push and Shove 2012: Taylor Swift –  Red 2012: Muse – The 2nd Law 2011: Florence + The Machine – Ceremonials 2011: Coldplay – Mylo Xyloto 2011: Bruce Springsteen – Wrecking Ball 2010: Lights – The Listening 
 2010: Usher – Raymond v. Raymond 2010: Nelly Furtado - The Best of Nelly Furtado 
 2010: Hurts – Happiness 2010: Goldfrapp – Head First 2010: Ellie Goulding – Lights 2010: P Diddy – Last Train to Paris 
 2010: Take That – Progress 2010: James Blunt – Some Kind of Trouble 2010: The Wanted – The Wanted 2010: N.E.R.D – Nothing 2010: Duran Duran – All You Need Is Now 2010: The Script – Science and Faith 2010: Cheryl Cole – Messy Little Raindrops 2010: Christina Aguilera – Bionic 

 2000s 

 2009: Green Day – 21st Century Breakdown 
 2009: Lady Gaga – The Fame Monster  
 2009: Tegan & Sara – Sainthood 
 2009: Muse – The Resistance 2009: Vedera – Stages 
 2009: Cheryl Cole – 3 Words 
 2009: Ciara – Fantasy Ride 
 2009: Franz Ferdinand – Tonight: Franz Ferdinand 
 2009: FrankMusik – Complete Me 
 2009: The Yeah You's – Looking Through You 2009: The Yeah Yeah Yeahs – It's Blitz 2009: Lenka – Trouble Is a Friend 2009: Sean Garrett – Turbo 919 
 2009: Lily Allen – It's Not Me, It's You 
 2008: The Script – The Script 
 2008: Sneaky Sound System – Sneaky Sound System 
 2008: The Pussycat Dolls – Doll Domination 
 2008: CSS – Donkey 2008: Pink – Funhouse 2008: Beyoncé – I Am... Sasha Fierce 2008: Madonna – Hard Candy 2007: M.I.A – Kala 
 2007: Maroon 5 – It Won't Be Soon Before Long 2007: Arcade Fire – Neon Bible 
 2007: Hard-Fi – Once Upon a Time in the West 
 2007: Stereophonics – Pull The Pin 
 2007: Natasha Bedingfield – N.B 2007: Björk – Volta 2006: Depeche Mode – The Complete Depeche Mode 
 2006: The Feeling – Twelve Stops and Home 2006: Keane – Under the Iron Sea 2006: Gwen Stefani – The Sweet Escape 2005: Madonna – Confessions on a Dance Floor 2005: Goldfrapp – Supernature 2005: Fischerspooner – Odyssey 2005: Kaiser Chiefs – Employment 
 2005: Aqualung – Strange and Beautiful 
 2005: Dave Mathews Band – Stand Up 2005: The Black Eyed Peas – Monkey Business 2004: Björk – Medúlla 2004: Keane – Hopes and Fears 2004: Gwen Stefani – Love. Angel. Music. Baby. 2004: Natasha Bedingfield – Unwritten 2003: Massive Attack – 100th Window 2003: Madonna – American Life 2003: Dave Mathews Band – Some Devil 2003: The Black Eyed Peas – Elephunk 2002: Linkin Park – Reanimation 2002: Oasis – Heathen Chemistry 2001: No Doubt – Rock Steady 2001: Björk – Vespertine 2000: All Saints – Saints & Sinners 
 2000: Madonna – Music 2000: Oasis – Standing on the Shoulder of Giants 2000: Oasis – Familiar to Millions 1990s 

 1999: Echo & The Bunnymen –  What Are You Going to Do with Your Life? – 
 1998: Massive Attack – Mezzanine 1998: Mansun – Six 1997: U2 – Pop 1997: Spice Girls – Spice World 1997: Erasure – Cowboy 1997: Björk – Homogenic 1996: Spice Girls – Spice 1994: Massive Attack – Protection 1994: Madonna – Bedtime Stories 1993: Depeche Mode – Songs of Faith and Devotion 1991: The KLF – The White Room 1980s 

 1989: ABC – Up 1988: The Mission – Tower of Strength 1987: Erasure – It Doesn't Have to Be 1985: The Cult – Love''

Notes and references

External links

Article by Paul Tingen from 1999: Spike Stent / The Work Of A Top-flight Mixer
Article by Paul Tingen in Sound on Sound magazine, February 2010: Spike Stent on his mix of Muse's album The Resistance

English audio engineers
English record producers
Living people
1965 births
People from Alton, Hampshire
Grammy Award winners